The Saint Peter Metropolitan Cathedral, also referred to as the San Pedro Cathedral or Davao Cathedral, is a Roman Catholic cathedral located at Barangay 2-A, Poblacion District, Davao City, Philippines. The cathedral, dedicated to Saint Peter, is the ecclesiastical seat of the Roman Catholic Archdiocese of Davao.

History
An earlier church, said to have been in Neo-Gothic style, was built in the same area as the current cathedral in 1847. In the 1960s, due to its small size, the Diocese of Davao solicited funds to enlarge the church. Architect Chiew  was responsible for the design of the new church, which was that of an ark, hence the pointed front where the cross stands. A separate bell tower was also constructed. The cathedral has been a witness to two bombing incidents: an incident in 1981 which killed 17 people, and one in 1993 with seven deaths.

Style and architecture
The magnificent Spanish-style cathedral with its distinctive modern design frontal-curved solid structure was first built using nipa and bamboo in 1847 and was subsequently rebuilt in wood in the mid-1900s by the late architect Ramon Basa, until it was finally remodeled in concrete in 1964 by Architect Manuel Chiew.

See also
Roman Catholicism in the Philippines
Roman Catholic Archdiocese of Davao

References

External links
 

Roman Catholic cathedrals in the Philippines
Buildings and structures in Davao City
Roman Catholic churches in Davao del Sur